Facklamia is a Gram-positive genus of bacteria from the family of Aerococcaceae. Facklamia bacteria are pathogens in humans.

References

Further reading 
 
 

Lactobacillales
Bacteria genera
Monotypic bacteria genera